= Matthew Pattenson =

English physician

- Occupation: Physician

Matthew Pattenson (fl. 1623) was an English royal physician and Catholic controversialist.

== Biography ==
Pattenson was a medical practitioner in the reign of James I, and was appointed physician in ordinary to Charles I. He wrote ‘The Image of Bothe Churches, Hiervsalem and Babel, Vnitie and Confusion, Obedienc [sic] and Sedition. By P. D. M.,’ Tournay (Adrian Quinque), 1623, 8vo, pp. 461; London, 1653, 12mo, pp. 643. Dedicated to Charles, prince of Wales. Gee, in his ‘Foot out of the Snare,’ 1624, mentions the work as by ‘M. Pateson, now in London, a bitter and seditious book.’ The authorship is also ascribed to Pattenson in the preface to Foulis's ‘History of the Romish Treasons and Usurpations,’ 1671; and by Wood, who states that the contents of the work were ‘mostly collected from the answers of Anti-Cotton, and John Brierley, Priest’ (Athenæ Oxon. ed. Bliss, iv. 139). Charles Butler highly commends the work, remarking that ‘in a short compass it comprises much useful information, and many excellent observations, arranged methodically, in a style always perspicuous, and generally elegant’ (Hist. Memoirs of the English Catholics, 3rd edit. iv. 453).
